Events from the 1180s in England.

Incumbents
Monarch – Henry II (to 6 July 1189), then Richard I

Events
 1180
 September – King Henry II renews the Pact of Ivry with the newly crowned King Philip II of France.
 Construction of Wells Cathedral begins.
 Ranulf de Glanvill writes the first known treatise on English law.
Coinage reform: new silver coins minted.
 Approximate completion date of synagogues at Jew's Court, Lincoln, and in Guildford.
 1181
 December – Baldwin of Exeter enthroned as Archbishop of Canterbury.
 A dispute arises between Henry II's sons Richard and Henry the Young King over lands in Aquitaine.
 Assize of Arms enacts military reform.
 1182
 Henry the Young King leads a rebellion against his father in Aquitaine.
 1183
 February – Geoffrey of Brittany allies with Henry the Young King against Henry II and Richard.
 Henry the Young King dies, ending the fighting in Aquitaine.
 The Boldon Book is compiled as a survey of the bishopric of Durham.
 1184
Assize of the Forest codifies laws protecting royal forests.
 Henry II's sons Richard and John dispute Aquitaine.
 A fire destroys Glastonbury Abbey.
 Gerald of Wales writes Topographica Hibernica.
 1185
 29 January – Henry declines an offer to become King of Jerusalem.
 10 February – Knights Templar consecrate Temple Church in London.
 Henry's estranged wife Queen Eleanor takes control of Aquitaine.
 11 April – the 1185 East Midlands earthquake destroys Lincoln Cathedral.
 25 April – John appointed as Lord of Ireland.
 December – John recalled from Ireland after antagonising both English lords and Irish chiefs.
 1186
 Henry restores Edinburgh to William I of Scotland.
 July – after the death of Geoffrey of Brittany, King Philip II of France claims rule over Brittany.
 1187
 May – Philip II invades Aquitaine, but makes a truce and agrees to crusade against Saladin with Henry II and Richard instead.
 1188
 Henry II imposes the Saladin tithe to pay for the planned crusade.
 11 November – Henry refuses to name Richard as his heir. Richard pays homage to King Philip II.
 Gerald of Wales begins writing Itinerarium Cambriae.
 The chronicle Flores Historiarum commences.
 1189
 May – Richard campaigns against his father Henry II in France.
 4 July – Henry II surrenders, agrees to make Richard his heir and pay an indemnity.
 6 July – Henry II dies; Richard becomes king. Eleanor of Aquitaine is released from imprisonment and rules as de facto regent for her son. Retrospectively (from the 13th century), the time before this in law becomes time immemorial.
 13 August – Richard sails from Barfleur to Portsmouth to take up his crown.
 3 September – coronation of Richard I at Westminster Abbey. Rising against Jews in London.
 12 December – Richard I embarks on the Third Crusade, appointing Hugh de Puiset and William Longchamp as justiciars in his absence.

Births
 1180
Gilbert de Clare, 4th Earl of Hertford, 5th Earl of Gloucester, soldier (died 1230)
 c. 1182
Hugh Bigod, 3rd Earl of Norfolk (died 1225)

Deaths
 1180
 25 October – John of Salisbury, bishop (born c. 1120)
 1181
 30 June – Hugh de Kevelioc, 3rd Earl of Chester, politician (born 1147)
 1183
 11 June – Henry the Young King, son of Henry II (born 1155)
 23 November – William Fitz Robert, 2nd Earl of Gloucester (born 1116)
 1184
 16 February – Richard of Dover, Archbishop of Canterbury (year of birth unknown)
 1186
 19 August – Geoffrey II, Duke of Brittany, son of Henry II (born 1158)
 1187
 18 February – Gilbert Foliot, Bishop of London (born c. 1110)
 1189
 6 July – King Henry II (born 1133)
 13 July – Matilda, Duchess of Saxony, daughter of Henry II (born 1156)
 20 or 21 August – Geoffrey Ridel, Bishop of Ely and former Lord Chancellor (year of birth unknown)
 14 November – William de Mandeville, 3rd Earl of Essex, Chief Justiciar (year of birth unknown)

References